Taylor Paige Lilley (born February 29, 1988) is an American professional basketball player in the WNBA.

After attending Hart High School (in Santa Clarita, California), she became a 4-year letterman for the University of Oregon Ducks.  She garnered Pac-10 All-Freshman accolades for the 2006–07 season, and went on to Pac-10 All-Conference honors the following 3 years.  Under new coach Paul Westhead, she had a break-out senior season (2009–2010) in which she led the team in scoring (a career best 17.5 points/game), finishing her career with 1,338 points (10th all-time in Oregon Duck history).  She holds the Oregon single season record for three point shoot percentage (50.6%), and her 254 career three-pointers is the best in Oregon history and 4th best in Pac-10 history.

A free agent signing of the Phoenix Mercury, she made the team roster for 2010 season over the two draft picks of the year.  She appeared in 21 games as a rookie. Per the Santa Clarita Signal, Lilley was recruited and signed by Mercury General Manager, Ann Meyers Drysdale.  However, she would be cut during the pre-season of the 2011 season. In 2012, she played in Australia for the Northside Wizards. She continued on in Australia in 2013 with the Stirling Senators, where she won two SBL Player of the Week awards.

Currently, she is the women's basketball head coach at Oaks Christian School in Westlake Village, CA.

Oregon statistics

Source

References

External links
 WNBA player profile

1988 births
Living people
American women's basketball players
Oregon Ducks women's basketball players
Phoenix Mercury players
Place of birth missing (living people)
People from Newhall, Santa Clarita, California
Sportspeople from Santa Clarita, California
Undrafted Women's National Basketball Association players
Guards (basketball)